Fargam  (Auspicious in Persian) was the name of a male Rhesus macaque monkey launched into space by Iran. This was Iran's second attempt at launching a monkey into space, their first attempt in 2010 had failed as the animal died in space. The news was released by Iranian state TV which also showed footage of Fargam strapped inside the rocket. Former president Rouhani congratulated Iranian Scientists afterwards, touting it as a "long step in getting the Islamic Republic of Iran closer to sending a man into space".

In 2010, Iran had successfully launched worms, a rat and a turtle into space.

Technology
The launch was conducted using the Pajoohesh (Research in Persian). The rocket was reported to have reached an altitude of 120 km (75 miles) before the capsule was parachuted down. The whole mission was reported to have lasted 15 minutes.

Skepticism 
Many are  skeptical of the claims made by Iran as the pictures released afterwards showed two different monkeys. The animal is suspected to have died in flight, although Iran had refuted the claim, saying that it was mix-up with pictures of another monkey candidate considered for the mission.

See also
 Monkeys and apes in space
 Animals in space
 Iranian Space Agency

References

Animals in space
Space program of Iran
Animal testing in Iran